Stephen David Reicher  is Bishop Wardlaw Professor of Social Psychology  at the University of St Andrews.

His research is in the area of social psychology, focusing on social identity, collective behaviour, intergroup conflict, leadership and mobilisation. He is broadly interested in the issues of group behaviour and the individual-social relationship.

Education
After attending the Perse School, Cambridge, Reicher completed his undergraduate degree at the University of Bristol and his PhD at the University of Aberdeen in 1984 with a thesis on collective behaviour. At Bristol, Reicher worked closely with Henri Tajfel and John Turner on social identity theory and social identity model of deindividuation effects (SIDE).

Career and research
Reicher held positions at the University of Dundee and University of Exeter before moving to St Andrews in 1998. He was formerly head of the School of Psychology at St Andrews.

He is a former Associate Editor of the Journal of Community and Applied Social Psychology and Chief Editor (with Margaret Wetherell) of the British Journal of Social Psychology.  Reicher is an editor for a number of journals including Scientific American Mind. His research is in the area of social psychology, focusing on social identity, collective behaviour, intergroup conflict, leadership and mobilisation. He is broadly interested in the issues of group behaviour and the individual-social relationship. His research interests can be grouped into three areas. The first is an attempt to develop a model of crowd action that accounts for both social determination and social change. The second concerns the construction of social categories through language and action. The third concerns political rhetoric and mass mobilisation – especially around the issue of national identity. His research has been funded by the Economic and Social Research Council (ESRC) and the Engineering and Physical Sciences Research Council (EPSRC). His former doctoral students include Fabio Sani.

Stephen Reicher as well as his direct University of Sussex colleague John Drury are both participants in the Sage subcommittee advising on behavioural science during the covid-19 pandemic.

Crowd psychology theory
Reicher's work on crowd psychology has challenged the dominant notion of crowd as site of irrationality and deindividuation. His social identity model (SIM, 1982, 1984, 1987) of crowd behaviour suggests that people are able to act as one in crowd events not because of 'contagion' or social facilitation but because they share a common social identity. This common identity specifies what counts as normative conduct. Unlike the 'classic' theories, which tended to presume that collectivity was associated with uncontrolled violence (due to a regression to instinctive drives or a pre-existing 'racial unconscious'), the social identity model explicitly acknowledges variety by suggesting that different identities have different norms – some peaceful, some conflictual – and that, even where crowds are conflictual, the targets will be only those specified by the social identity of the crowd.

BBC Prison study
Reicher collaborated with Alex Haslam of the University of Exeter on the BBC television programme The Experiment, which examined conflict, order, rebellion and tyranny in the behaviour of a group of individuals held in a simulated prison environment. The experiment (which became known as the BBC Prison Study) re-examined issues raised by the Stanford Prison Experiment (SPE) and led to a number of publications in leading psychology journals. Amongst other things, these challenged the role account of tyranny associated with the SPE as well as broader ideas surrounding the Banality of Evil, and advanced a social identity-based understanding of the dynamics of resistance.

Publications

Turner, J. C., Hogg, M. A., Oakes, P. J., Reicher, S. D., & Wetherell, M. S. (1987). Rediscovering the social group: A self-categorization theory. Oxford: Blackwell.
Reicher, S. D. & Hopkins, N. (2001). Self and nation: Categorization, contestation and mobilisation. London: Sage.
Haslam, S.A; Reicher, S.D. & Platow, M.J. (2010) "The New Psychology Of Leadership: Identity, Influence And Power" New York: Psychology Press
Reicher, S. D. (1984). The St. Pauls riot: An explanation of the limits of crowd action in terms of a social identity model.
Reicher, S. & Potter, J. (1985). Psychological theory as intergroup perspective: A comparative analysis of ‘scientific’ and ‘lay’ accounts of crowd events. Human Relations, 38, 167–189.
Reicher S. D., &  Hopkins, N. (1996). Seeking influence through characterising self-categories: An analysis of anti-abortionist rhetoric. British Journal of Social Psychology, 35, 297–311.
Reicher, S. (1996). The Crowd century: Reconciling practical success with theoretical failure. British Journal of Social Psychology, 35, 535–53.
Reicher S. D., &  Hopkins, N. (1996). Self-category constructions in political rhetoric; An analysis of Thatcher's and Kinnock's speeches concerning the British miners' strike (1984–85) European Journal of Social Psychology, 26, 353–371.
Reicher, S. D., & Haslam, S. A. (2006). Rethinking the psychology of tyranny: The BBC Prison Experiment. British Journal of Social Psychology, 45, 1–40.
Reicher, S. D., Haslam, S. A., & Hopkins, N. (2005). Social identity and the dynamics of leadership: Leaders and followers as collaborative agents in the transformation of social reality. Leadership Quarterly. 16, 547–568.
Reicher, S.D. (1982). The determination of collective behaviour (pp. 41–83). In H. Tajfel (ed.), Social identity and intergroup relations. Cambridge: Cambridge University Press. 
Reicher, S.D. (1984b). The St Pauls' riot: An explanation of the limits of crowd action in terms of a social identity model. European Journal of Social Psychology, 14, 1–21. Also in: Murphy, J., John, M. & Brown, H. (1984), (eds.). Dialogues and debates in social psychology (pp. 187–205). London: Lawrence Erlbaum/Open University
Reicher, S.D. (1987). Crowd behaviour as social action. In J.C. Turner, M.A. Hogg, P.J. Oakes, S.D. Reicher & M.S. Wetherell, Rediscovering the social group: A self-categorization theory (pp. 171–202). Oxford: Blackwell.
Reicher, S., Spears, R. & Postmes, T. (1995). A social identity model of deindividuation phenomena. In W. Stroebe & M. Hewstone (eds.), European Review of Social Psychology, 6, 161–98.
Reicher, S. (1996) Social identity and social change: Rethinking the context of social psychology. In W.P. Robinson (Ed.) Social groups and identities: Developing the legacy of Henri Tajfel (pp. 317–336). London: Butterworth.
Reicher, S. (1996). ‘The Battle of Westminster’: Developing the social identity model of crowd behaviour to explain the initiation and development of collective conflict. European Journal of Social Psychology, 26, 115–34.
Reicher, S. (2001). The psychology of crowd dynamics. In M.A. Hogg and R.S. Tindale (Eds.), Blackwell handbook of social psychology: Group processes (pp. 182–208). Oxford: Blackwell. 
Stott, C., Hutchison, P. & Drury, J. (2001). 'Hooligans' abroad? Inter-group dynamics, social identity and participation in collective 'disorder' at the 1998 World Cup Finals. British Journal of Social Psychology, 40, 359–384.
Stott, C. & Reicher, S. (1998a). Crowd action as inter-group process: Introducing the police perspective. European Journal of Social Psychology, 28, 509–529.
Stott, C. & Reicher, S. (1998b). How conflict escalates: The inter-group dynamics of collective football crowd ‘violence’. Sociology, 32, 353–77. 
Drury, J., Cocking, C., Beale, J., Hanson, C. & Rapley, F. (2005). The phenomenology of empowerment in collective action. British Journal of Social Psychology, 44, 309–328.
Reicher, S. (2001). Studying psychology, studying racism. In M. Augoustinos & K. J. Reynolds. (Eds.), Understanding prejudice, Racism, and Social conflict. London: Sage.
Drury, J. & Reicher, S. (1999). The intergroup dynamics of collective empowerment: Substantiating the social identity model of crowd behaviour. Group Processes and Intergroup Relations, 2, 381–402.
Drury J. & Reicher S. (2000) Collective action and psychological change: The emergence of new social identities. British Journal of Social Psychology, 39, 579 -604.
Drury, J. & Reicher, S. (2005). Explaining enduring empowerment: A comparative study of collective action and psychological outcomes. European Journal of Social Psychology, 35, 35–58. 
Drury, J., Reicher, S. & Stott, C. (2003) Transforming the boundaries of collective identity: From the ‘local’ anti-road campaign to ‘global’ resistance? Social Movement Studies, 2, 191–212.
Reicher, S.  Haslam, S.A. & Rath, R. (2008) "Making a virtue of evil: A five step social identity model of development of collective hate”

Awards and distinctions
 2021 - Honorary Fellow, British Psychological Society (HonFBPsS)
 2018 - Fellow of the British Academy (FBA)
 2004 - Fellow of the Royal Society of Edinburgh (FRSE)

-He was interviewed by Jim Al-Khalili for The Life Scientific first broadcast on BBC Radio 4 in March 2018.

References

British psychologists
Alumni of the University of Bristol
Alumni of the University of Aberdeen
Academics of the University of St Andrews
Academics of the University of Exeter
Academics of the University of Dundee
Fellows of the Royal Society of Edinburgh
Fellows of the British Academy
Living people
Year of birth missing (living people)
Political psychologists